Niger famine could refer to:

The Sahel drought and resulting famine of the 1970s and early 1980s
The 2005-06 Niger food crisis